Jill Dorothy Ireland (24 April 1936 – 18 May 1990) was an English actress and singer. She appeared in 16 films with her second husband, Charles Bronson, and was involved in two other of Bronson’s films as a producer.

Life and career
Born in London, Ireland was the daughter of a wine importer. She began acting in the mid-1950s with small roles in films including Simon and Laura (1955) and Three Men in a Boat (1956).

In 1957, Ireland married actor David McCallum after the couple met while working on the film Hell Drivers (1957). Later, they appeared together in five episodes of The Man from U.N.C.L.E.: "The Quadripartite Affair" (season 1, episode 3, 1964), "The Giuoco Piano Affair" (season 1, episode 7, 1964), "The Tigers Are Coming Affair" (season 2, episode 8, 1965), and a two-parter "The Five Daughters Affair" (season 3, episodes 28 & 29, 1967). They had three sons, Paul, Valentine, and Jason (who was adopted). McCallum and Ireland divorced in 1967. Jason McCallum died of a drug overdose in 1989, six months before Ireland's death.

In 1968, Ireland married Charles Bronson. She had met him when he and McCallum were filming The Great Escape (1963) some years earlier. Together they had a daughter, Zuleika, and adopted a daughter, Katrina. They remained married until Ireland's death in 1990.

Death and legacy
Ireland was diagnosed with breast cancer in 1984. After her diagnosis, Ireland wrote two books, chronicling her battle with the disease. At the time of her death, she was writing a third book and became a spokeswoman for the American Cancer Society. In 1988, she testified before the U.S. Congress about medical costs and was given the American Cancer Society's Courage Award by President Ronald Reagan.

In 1990, Ireland died of breast cancer at her home in Malibu, California. She was cremated and her ashes were placed in a cane which Charles Bronson had buried with him at Brownsville Cemetery when he died in 2003.

For her contribution to the film industry, Jill Ireland has a star on the Hollywood Walk of Fame at 6751 Hollywood Boulevard.

In 1991, Ireland was portrayed by Jill Clayburgh in the made-for-television film Reason for Living: The Jill Ireland Story. The film, which was based on Ireland's memoir Lifelines and listed her posthumously as an executive producer received mixed reviews from critics. To prepare for the role, Clayburgh, who had never met Ireland, read Lifelines, and listened to Ireland's recorded interviews.

Filmography

Books
 Life Wish: a Personal Story of Survival (1987) , 
 Lifeline: My Fight to Save My Family (1989) ,

References

External links
 
 

 

1936 births
1990 deaths
20th-century British non-fiction writers
20th-century British women writers
20th-century English actresses
Actresses from London
Deaths from breast cancer
Deaths from cancer in California
English autobiographers
English expatriates in the United States
English film actresses
English television actresses
Women autobiographers